War of Rights is an early access first-person shooter game being developed by the Danish company Campfire Games.

History 
Campfire Games founders Mads Larsen and Emil Hansen began developing War of Rights in 2012, and successfully raised US$118,000 on Kickstarter three years later. They released an early access version on 3 December 2018, and added the ability to fire artillery in 2020.

Setting and gameplay 
The game is set during the Maryland campaign of the American Civil War, including the Battle of Antietam. It includes detailed recreations of period uniforms, weapons, and artillery. The game is multiplayer only, featuring up to 300 participants per match. The game emphasizes realism, including a chain of command and tactical formations with players receiving positive benefits for following orders and maintaining formation.

References

External links

Steam page

Upcoming video games
Windows games
Windows-only games
Cooperative video games
Early access video games
First-person shooters
Tactical shooter video games
American Civil War video games
Video games developed in Denmark